Alldis is a surname. Notable people with the surname include:

Barry Alldis (1930–1982), Australian radio personality
Dominic Alldis (born 1962), English jazz musician
Gillie Alldis (1920–1998), English footballer
Jim Alldis Jr. (born 1949), English cricketer
Jim Alldis Sr. (1916–1995), English cricket scorer and manager
John Alldis (1929–2010), English conductor
Michael Alldis (born 1968), English boxer
Septimus Alldis (1886–1929), Australian politician